Tirupati district is one of the twenty-six districts in the Indian state of Andhra Pradesh . The district headquarters is located at Tirupati city. Tirupati district is known for its numerous historic temples, including the Hindu shrine of Tirumala Venkateswara Temple, Sri Kalahasteeswara temple and many others.The district is also home to Satish Dhawan Space Centre (formerly Sriharikota Range), a rocket launch centre located in Sriharikota and operated by Indian Space Research Organisation (ISRO). The river Swarnamukhi flows through Tirupati, Srikalahasti and joins with the Bay of Bengal in this district. Industries include groundnuts and paddy fields.

The district is an educational hub and has central and state universities and institutes including IIT Tirupati, Sri Venkateswara University, National Sanskrit University, IISER Tirupati. The district is home to Sri City, one of the leading special economic zone (SEZ) in India with total investments of 4 billion USD and over two hundred companies from 28 countries. Sri City is considered a major industrial hub and SEZ in India.

Geography 
Tirupati district is located between the Northern Latitudes of 13°21′54″ and 14°30′40″ and between the Eastern Longitudes 79°5′42″ and 80°4′10″. It is bordered by SPSR Nellore district to the North, Chittoor and Annamayya districts to the west and Tiruvallur district of Tamil Nadu to south and Bay of Bengal to the east. The river Swarnamukhi flows from  Tirupati, Srikalahasti in Tirupati district, and the major part of Pulicat Lake is in this district.

Etymology 
The district derived its name from its main city, Tirupati. In Tamil translation, tiru means sacred or Lakshmi and pati means abode or husband.

History 
On 26 January 2022, Balaji district was nominated as one of the twenty-six districts in a 13-district Andhra Pradesh, pending a final notification to be issued by the government of Andhra Pradesh. The district would be formed from Tirupati revenue division, from former Chittoor district, Gudur and Naidupeta revenue divisions of former Nellore district. The name was later changed to Tirupati district and came into existence on 4 April 2022, with Gudur, Sullurupeta revenue divisions from Nellore district and Srikalahasti and Tirupati divisions from Chittoor district, with Srikalahasti division being newly created.

Demographics 

At the time of the 2011 census, Tirupati district had a population of 21,96,984, of which 850,056 (38.69%) lived in urban areas. Tirupati district had a sex ratio of 1000 females per 1000 males. Scheduled Castes and Scheduled Tribes make up 5,19,388 (23.64%) and 1,70,779 (7.77%) of the population respectively.

At the time of the 2011 census, 88.00% of the population spoke Telugu, 6.50% Tamil and 3.64% Urdu as their first language.

Administrative divisions 

The district has four revenue divisions, Gudur, Srikalahasti, Sullurupeta and Tirupati and has one administrative headquarters Tirupati, each headed by a sub-collector. These revenue divisions are divided into 34 mandals. The district has one municipal corporation, Tirupati city. The district has six municipalities at Gudur, Srikalahasti, Naidupeta, Sullurpeta, Puttur and Venkatagiri.This district also comprises 822 Gram Panchayats and 1107 villages.

Mandals 

There are 9 mandals each in Tirupati division and Sullurupeta divisions, 8 mandals each in Gudur division and Srikalahasti divisions. The 34 mandals under their revenue divisions are listed below:

Cities and towns 

The district has one municipal corporation at Tirupati city, and six  municipalities at Srikalahasti, Gudur, Naidupeta, Sullurpeta, Puttur and Venkatagiri. This district also has many census towns, 822 gram panchayats and 1107 villages.

Villages 
 

Nennur

Education 
Sri Venkateswara University
Sri Padmavati Mahila Visvavidyalayam
Government Institute of Ceramic Technology
National Institute of Ocean Technology
IIT Tirupati 
IISER Tirupati
National Sanskrit University
Indian Culinary Institute, Tirupati
Sri Venkateswara Vedic University
Sri Venkateswara Veterinary University (SVVU)
Sri Venkateswara Institute of Medical Sciences (SVIMS)
 Acharya N.G.Ranga Agricultural University Tirupati Campus 
Sri Venkateswara Institute of Cancer Care and Advanced Research Tata Trusts - SVICCAR Hospital
 Sree Vidyanikethan Educational Institution
 Krea University
 Institute of Financial Management and Research 
 Indian Institute of Information Technology, Sri City

Transport

Railways
This district has the third biggest railway station in Andhra Pradesh. Tirupati railway station is among the busiest railway stations of India, connected with all major cities of India. It is on the Renigunta-Katpadi railway line.

Tirupati city has five railway stations:
 Tirupati Main
 Renigunta junction
 Tirupati west Halt
 Tiruchanur
 Chandragiri

Tirupati district also has a major railway station at Gudur junction. The other important railway stations in the district are Srikalahasti railway station, Pakala junction, Puttur and Sullurupeta railway station.

Roadways
APSRTC has 10 Depots and Tirupati city has 4 depots which are used to connect with all major cities in AP and neighbouring states. 

National Highway 71 connecting Madanapalle and Nayudupeta Via Pileru and NH 716 connecting Chennai in Tamil Nadu passes through the district. National Highway 16, a part of the Golden Quadrilateral connecting Kolkata-Chennai passes through Sullurpeta and Gudur towns in the district. A new six lane express way has been constructed between Tirupati and Bangalore via Chittoor.

Waterways
Dugarajapatnam Port is a proposed port in the district.

Airways

Tirupati Airport is being upgraded to an international airport. The new terminal was inaugurated on 22 October 2015.

Notable people 
 M. A. Ayyangar, first deputy speaker and second Speaker of Lok Sabha
 V. Nagayya, actor
 D. K. Adikesavulu Naidu, Member of Parliament
 N. Chandrababu Naidu, Chief Minister of United Andhra Pradesh (1995–2004), and first Chief Minister of Residual State Of Andhra Pradesh (2014–2019)
 N. Janardhana Reddy, 12th Chief Minister of Andhra Pradesh
 Venkatesh Geriti, political activist
 Chadalavada Krishna Murthy, Ex TTD Chairman ,Ex Tirupati MLA
Bhumana Karunakar Reddy, Tirupati, MLA
 Madhurantakam Rajaram, writer, Sahitya Akademi Award winner
 Raj Reddy, Computer Scientist and winner of Turing Award
 Roja Selvamani, actress, Minister for Tourism, Culture and Youth Advancement of Andhra Pradesh 
 Shafi (actor), film actor.

Politics 

There are one parliamentary and seven assembly constituencies in Tirupati district. The parliamentary constituency is Tirupati (Lok Sabha constituency).

The assembly constituencies are:

References

External links 

Tirupati district
Districts of Andhra Pradesh
Rayalaseema
2022 establishments in Andhra Pradesh